The Eudelin was a French automobile manufactured from around 1905 until 1908.  The product of a Parisian builder, it came in 14/16 hp and 25/40 four-cylinder models.  The company also produced an opposed-piston engine with a complex variable-stroke linkage.  The original power unit was described as a "double piston engine with a single double throw crank directly below the combustion chamber".

References

Defunct motor vehicle manufacturers of France
Manufacturing companies based in Paris